Group H of the 2022 FIFA World Cup took place from 24 November to 2 December 2022. The group consisted of Portugal, Ghana, Uruguay and South Korea. The top two teams, Portugal and South Korea advanced to the round of 16. Uruguay exited the tournament after failing to progress the group stage for the first time since 2002, with South Korea's shock 2–1 victory over Portugal contributing to the elimination.

Teams

Notes

Standings

In the round of 16:
 The winners of Group H, Portugal, advanced to play the runners-up of Group G, Switzerland.
 The runners-up of Group H, South Korea, advanced to play the winners of Group G, Brazil.

Matches
All times listed are local, AST (UTC+3).

Uruguay vs South Korea
The teams had met eight times including twice in the World Cup, both matches ending in victories for Uruguay; 1–0 in the group stage in 1990 and 2–1 in the round of 16 in 2010.

Portugal vs Ghana
The teams had met once, in Portugal's 2–1 group stage victory in the 2014 FIFA World Cup.

In the 65th minute, Portugal were awarded a penalty when Mohammed Salisu fouled Cristiano Ronaldo in the penalty area. Ronaldo took the penalty and scored, shooting high to the left of the goal to put Portugal into the lead. With this goal, Ronaldo became the first male player to score at five FIFA World Cup tournaments. André Ayew equalised for Ghana in the 73rd minute with a close range finish after a low cross from Mohammed Kudus on the left. Portugal responded with two goals, the first coming from João Félix five minutes later with a clipped finish from the right over the advancing goalkeeper, and the second from Rafael Leão two minutes later with a low finish from the left to the right corner after a pass from Bruno Fernandes. In the 89th minute, Osman Bukari scored for Ghana to make it 3–2 with a header from six yards out after a cross from the left. Then, in stoppage time, Ghana almost equalised when Portugal goalkeeper Diogo Costa put the ball on the floor, preparing to kick it upfield; Ghana's Iñaki Williams came from behind him to take the ball but slipped as he was about to shoot, with the ball subsequently cleared from danger by Portugal.

South Korea vs Ghana
The two teams had faced each other eight times, most recently in 2014, a friendly which Ghana won 4–0.

When referee Anthony Taylor ended the game instead of allowing a South Korean player to kick off a corner, South Korea's head coach Paulo Bento ran onto the field and screamed at the referee, for which he was shown a red card, making it the first time in World Cup history that a coach was sent off after the conclusion of the match. Counting players' Leandro Cufré's and Josip Šimunić's red cards (both in 2006), this was the third time a sending off occurred after the match had ended.

Portugal vs Uruguay
The teams had met three times including once in the World Cup, in Uruguay's 2–1 round of 16 victory in 2018.

Bruno Fernandes put Portugal into the lead when his cross from the left deceived Uruguay keeper Sergio Rochet after Cristiano Ronaldo had tried to glance it past him. Ronaldo was initially ruled as the goalscorer before FIFA determined that he hadn't connected with the ball and instead awarded the goal to Fernandes. Fernandes scored a second in the 93rd minute, a penalty awarded by the VAR for handball by José Giménez, which he rolled into the left side of the net.
With this victory, Portugal secured a place in the round of 16.

Ghana vs Uruguay
The teams had met once in the 2010 FIFA World Cup quarter-finals, won 4–2 by Uruguay on penalties after a 1–1 draw.

Uruguay failed to progress past the group stage for the first time since 2002, and became the second South American team after Ecuador to be eliminated from the group stage of the 2022 tournament.

As Giorgian de Arrascaeta netted a brace, Uruguay became the last team of all thirty-two participants to score their first goal at the 2022 FIFA World Cup.

South Korea vs Portugal
Prior to this match, the two teams had met once, in South Korea's 1–0 group stage victory in the 2002 FIFA World Cup.

With South Korea's win against Portugal, they advanced to the round of 16 for the first time since 2010, beating Uruguay on goals scored.

Discipline
Fair play points would have been used as tiebreakers if the overall and head-to-head records of teams were tied. These were calculated based on yellow and red cards received in all group matches as follows:
first yellow card: −1 point;
indirect red card (second yellow card): −3 points;
direct red card: −4 points;
yellow card and direct red card: −5 points;

Only one of the above deductions was applied to a player in a single match.

Notes

References

External links

 

2022 FIFA World Cup
Portugal at the 2022 FIFA World Cup
Ghana at the 2022 FIFA World Cup
Uruguay at the 2022 FIFA World Cup
South Korea at the 2022 FIFA World Cup